Lords of Dogtown is a 2005 American biographical drama film directed by Catherine Hardwicke and written by Stacy Peralta. The film follows a group of young skateboarders in Santa Monica, California during the 70s. This is the first (and so far only) production made by both Columbia Pictures and TriStar Pictures. The film received mixed reviews and grossed $13 million at the box office.

Plot
Set in the Dogtown area of Santa Monica/Venice in the mid–1970s, surfers Tony Alva, Stacy Peralta, and Jay Adams enjoy the life of skating and surfing the pier with board designer Skip Engblom and the other locals. One day, Skip is given polyurethane wheels for the skateboards in his shop, Zephyr Surf Shop. Teenager Sid, a friend of the boys who works in the same shop, invites Tony, Jay, Stacy, and the other locals to test the new wheels. They are all amazed as the polyurethane wheels allow the skateboards to make the same carves on flat ground as surfboards on the waves. After witnessing what skaters could now do with the wheels, Skip decides to add to his already famous surf team a skate team, the Z-Boys. The team proves to be a success; winning many contests, Stacy, Jay, and Tony gain popularity from locals across Venice.

A period of hot weather reduces the surf at the pier and the official declaration of a drought means swimming pools cannot be filled with water. Taking advantage of this the Z-Boys start sneaking into local backyard pools to skate in, ignoring Skip's practice sessions, which angers him. After winning many major contests, the Z-Boys become more and more famous, appearing in various magazines. Stacy, Jay, and Tony start getting noticed by major skating companies looking to take the boys from Skip. 

One night, Skip throws a party at his shop to celebrate the success of the team. A company owner, Topper Burks, enters the party and convinces Tony that Skip is holding him back and that it's time to make him famous worldwide. Tony accepts his offer and leaves the team. Jay leaves the team as well, looking to make more money to help his mom pay the rent on their apartment. Despite Skip's desperate offers to keep him on the team, Stacy is the last to leave, as he begins getting offers to skate as well as to appear on television. Sad and angry, Skip decides to shut down the Zephyr Skate Team.

The three boys become major celebrities. Tony and Stacy now skate for money rather than the passion that Jay continues to skate for. They become rivals and compete against each other in various contests. Stacy appears on the original Charlie's Angels show while Tony starts creating his own commercials to manufacture his popular boards and merchandise. Jay is offered $10,000 to appear in a commercial sponsoring the toy, Slinky. However, he refuses, as he has become a much harder person than before. 

Soon, matters start spiraling out of control; at a major skating championship that they all take part in, Tony gets into a fight with another skater in the middle of the stadium and gets violently knocked out, hospitalizing him and temporarily halting his career. Jay leaves the company he had endorsed when they sacrifice quality for cheap materials. Stacy ends up winning the competition.

Back in Venice, the pier that the Z-Boys use to surf around burns down, which affects them all. Jay shaves his hair and becomes a gang member. Skip, still selling surfboards in his shop, finally decides to settle down and continues his passion for sanding and creating surfboards, as well as solving his financial troubles by selling his shop and is seen singing "Maggie May". 

Sid's long-time equilibrium problem turns out to be caused by a brain tumor, and he undergoes surgery. Though Stacy, Tony, and Jay have all gone their separate ways, they all show up at the same time to visit Sid. Stacy reveals that he is leaving his company to start his own. Sid's father empties their pool for them to skate in. Stacy, Tony, and Jay skate the pool and bring Sid into the fun on his wheelchair, referencing all the good times they had before they became a skate team.

Closing cards reveal that Tony Alva went on to become skateboarding's first world champion and runs Alva Skates (stating that he still sneaks into backyard pools); Stacy Peralta started Powell Peralta, a modern popular skating company that included a 14-year-old Tony Hawk as part of its Bones Brigade team; and Jay, too, achieved the only kind of success at skating and surfing he really cared about, becoming known as the "spark that started the flame" Original Seed; he was arrested on drug-related charges but was later released on parole and continues to skate and charge big waves in Hawaii; Sid later died of brain cancer shortly after the DOGBOWL sessions.

Cast

Main cast

 Emile Hirsch as Jay Adams
 John Robinson as Stacy Peralta
 Victor Rasuk as Tony Alva
 Heath Ledger as Skip Engblom
 Michael Angarano as Sid
 Nikki Reed as Kathy Alva
 Rebecca De Mornay as Philaine
 William Mapother as Donnie
 Vincent Laresca as Chino
 Elden Henson as Billy Z
 Mitch Hedberg as Frank Nasworthy 
 Stephanie Limb as Peggy Oki
 Mike Ogas as Bob Biniak
 Don Nguyen as Shogo Kubo
 Melonie Diaz as Blanca
 Eddie Cahill as Larry Gordon
 Laura Ramsey as Gabrielle
 Steve Badillo as Ty Page
 Pablo Schreiber as Craig Stecyk
 America Ferrera as Thunder Monkey
 Sofia Vergara as Amelia
 Chelsea Hobbs as Caroline
 Ned Bellamy as Peter Darling
 Shea Whigham as Drake Landon

Cameos

 Johnny Knoxville as Topper Burks
 Allen Sarlo as Himself
 Charles Napier as Nudie
 Jay Adams as House party guest
 Tony Alva as Oregon man at party
 Stacy Peralta as TV director
 Skip Engblom as Seattle race starter
 Tony Hawk as Astronaut
 Jeremy Renner as Jay Adams' manager
 Joel McHale as TV reporter
 Alexis Arquette as Tranny
 Bai Ling as Punky photographer
 Lance Mountain as UK policeman
 Craig Stecyk as Seattle race photographer

Development
Both David Fincher and Fred Durst were slated to direct the film, but Catherine Hardwicke eventually landed the job, and Fincher stayed on as executive producer. The film was shot in Imperial Beach in San Diego County.

Release
Lords of Dogtown was the first film to be released by both Columbia Pictures and TriStar Pictures which are both trademarked by Sony Pictures Entertainment and are sometimes referred to as Columbia TriStar Pictures.

Reception 
Upon its release, Lords of Dogtown received mostly mixed reviews. The film holds a 55% approval rating on Rotten Tomatoes based on 146 reviews, with an average rating of 5.95/10. The site's consensus reads: "Lords of Dogtown, while slickly made and edited, lacks the depth and entertaining value of the far superior documentary on the same subject, Dogtown and Z-Boys." Metacritic reports a score of 56% based on 35 critics, indicating "Mixed or average reviews".

Ledger's portrayal of Skip Engblom was applauded for its realism and is considered one of the film's principal highlights. Joe Donnelly, who knew Engblom, was impressed by Ledger's attention to detail, saying, "He's almost eerie in how precisely he nailed not only the mannerisms, cadence and physical presence of Skip... but also how he raises Skip's spirit, which is the heart and soul and most what's really great in a not-altogether-great film."

Luke Davies of The Monthly concedes how flamboyant the character is, but says the film is saved by Ledger's emotional depth: "The performance constantly sails close to hammy – Engblom was, by all accounts, a flamboyant character – but is pulled back, the wildness offset by a surprising depth of sadness. As in a number of Ledger roles, a kind of animal wisdom and melancholy exists side-by-side with gangly comedy."

A.O. Scott of The New York Times also highlighted Ledger's performances, stating, "Skip is always volatile, frequently drunk and consistently the most entertaining figure in the movie". He also praised the movie as a whole, stating, "Lords of Dogtown from start to finish is pretty much a blast".

However, the movie has gained a general cult following since its release. It is also considered to be one of the best skateboarding movies of all time according to many fans of the sport.

Accolades
The Central Ohio Film Critics Association named Heath Ledger Actor of the Year for this film.

Lords of Dogtown is at #417 on the Empire list of "The 500 Greatest Movies of All Time".

Soundtrack

The film's soundtrack features songs by Sparklehorse (covering Pink Floyd's "Wish You Were Here"), Deep Purple, Black Sabbath, Cher, David Bowie, Neil Young, T.Rex, Jimi Hendrix, and Iggy Pop among others, as well as a cover of The Clash's "Death or Glory" by Social Distortion.

Home media
The film was released on VHS, DVD and UMD on September 27, 2005. The DVD includes original Z-Boys cameos, director and cast commentaries, deleted scenes, a making-of feature, and make-up test outtakes.

Television series
In January 2021, it was announced that television series based on the movie was in development for Freevee.

See also
 Dogtown and Z-Boys

References

External links

 
 
 
 

2005 biographical drama films
2005 films
American teen drama films
Columbia Pictures films
Films directed by Catherine Hardwicke
Films scored by Mark Mothersbaugh
Films set in Santa Monica, California
Films set in the 1970s
Films shot in Los Angeles County, California
Skateboarding films
2000s sports drama films
Sports films based on actual events
American surfing films
Transgender-related films
TriStar Pictures films
American sports drama films
2005 drama films
2000s English-language films
2000s American films
Films shot in San Diego
Films set in San Diego
English-language drama films